The Sri Lanka Journalism Awards for Excellence is an awards ceremony held annually in Sri Lanka to recognize the achievements of print media journalists working in the country’s three main languages – Sinhala, Tamil and English.

It is the biggest print media awards programme in the country and is the only independent print media awards ceremony that has no affiliations or obligations to the government or any private institutions.

In addition to awarding the top achievers of several categories in the print media each year, it also honours those who have served the journalistic profession for more than 40 years with Lifetime Achievement Awards.

Each winner receives a trophy made in the shape of the nib of a fountain pen and a certificate. Applicants who do not win a category but have satisfied the standards set by the panel of judges receive merit awards which are only certificates.

No cash or other prizes and incentives are offered to the winners. In some years, the winners received other gifts such as mobile phones or tablets along with their awards.

History 

The Journalism Awards Programme was inaugurated in 1999 by The Editors’ Guild of Sri Lanka (TEGOSL) following the “Colombo Declaration on Media Freedom and Social Responsibility.”

In 2004, the Sri Lanka Press Institute (SLPI) was established and from then on, the Awards Night was jointly organized by TEGOSL and the SLPI.

The inaugural ceremony was held at TransAsia Hotel in Colombo. After that, the ceremony moved to Mount Lavinia Hotel which became a co-sponsor of the event and became the host for every ceremony after that. Usually, the ceremony is held in the last week of July every year.

Entry and prize considerations 
The Journalism Awards for Excellence programme does not automatically consider all applicable works in media. All interested candidates are invited every year to apply for an award in a category of their choice. Generally, the entries close in the last week of March every year.

To be considered for an award, the qualifying work should have been published in a Sri Lankan newspaper between January 1 and December 31 of the preceding year.

To qualify for awards, the applicant should be a full-time journalist, a journalism student doing an internship or someone who had a minimum of ten articles published in a newspaper during the previous calendar year.

The organisers announce the application deadline in media and also on the Sri Lanka Press Institute website.

Along with the newspaper articles, candidates are required to submit an application form which can be downloaded from the Sri Lanka Press Institute website.

The organisers appoint a panel of judges every year and this panel is allowed to meet and consider the entries independently.

There is no competitive process or an involvement of the judges for three of the main award categories. These “Special Awards” are conferred by the TEGSOL as determined by them. The Special Awards categories are; “D.  R. Wijewardene Award for Earning the Appreciation of Peers and the Public”, “Sepala Gunasena Award for Defending Press Freedom in Sri Lanka” and “Long and Distinguished Service”.

Changes in Award categories 
The award categories have changed over the years. Some new categories have been introduced; some categories have been abandoned while some categories have undergone changes to the name of the category.

From 2000 to 2006, there were three separate awards named D.B. Dhanapala award for Best Journalist in Sinhala Language,  D. B. Dhanapala award for Best Journalist in Tamil Language and D. B. Dhanapala award for Best Journalist in English Language. This was in addition to the main award Mervyn de Silva Award for Journalist of the Year. But D.B. Dhanapala Awards were abandoned in 2006.

The Upali Wijewardene Award for Human Interest Reporting category underwent a change of name to Upali Wijewardene Award for Feature writer of the year after the first two years.

Best Environmental Reporter of The Year was initially known as the Best Environmental Report of the Year.

D. B. Dhanapala Award for the Scoop of the Year later shed “D. B. Dhanapala Award” from its category title, and is now known as the “Scoop of the Year”

A significant new category for Investigative Journalist of the Year was introduced in 2008, while a new category for news websites was introduced from 2016. Best Health Care and Medical Reporter category was introduced in 2017.

An award for Best TV News Story was offered in 2007 but was abandoned after that.

Several Award categories started as one main award but were later divided into three language categories later.

Controversies 
Journalists of the Leader Group of Publications which published the newspapers The Sunday Leader, The Morning Leader and Irudina boycotted the 2003 programme to show solidarity with one of their colleagues Frederica Jansz alleging that Jansz had to face harassment from the Editors’ Guild of Sri Lanka regarding her application. Incidentally, Jansz won the top award – “Mervyn de Silva Award for Journalist of the Year” at the following year’s edition of the programme.

Then in 2007, the Leader Group claimed that a new regulation introduced by the organisers forced them out of contention for awards. The newspaper published an article alleging that the new regulation made it mandatory for all applications to be endorsed by the editor of the publication to the fact that the applicant subscribed to the Code of Ethics of the Editors’ Guild and the Press Complaints Commission of Sri Lanka.

All editors of the group including The Sunday Leader Editor Lasantha Wickrematunge were not members of the Editors’ Guild and did not subscribe to the Press Complaints Commission or the mandate of the Sri Lanka Press Institute. It effectively meant that the journalists of the Group were not eligible to apply for awards.

Interestingly, until that year, The Sunday Leader was one of the most successful publications at the awards programme producing the winner of Journalist of the Year Award every year except in 1998 and 2001. (They boycotted the event in 2003).

Two years later, journalists from the Leader Group of Publications resumed taking part in the programme as some regulations were changed. Wickrematunge was assassinated in 2009.

Multiple award winning journalists (more than four) 
 9 – Sonali Samarasinghe (The Sunday Leader) – Mervyn de Silva Journalist of the Year 2000, 2001, 2005, 2006, D. B. Dhanapala Award for Best Journalist of the Year - English Language Press 2000, Scoop of the Year 1998, 2000, 2006, B. A. Siriwardene Award for the Columnist of the Year (English) 2006
 7 – Ranee Mohamed (The Sunday Leader) - D. B. Dhanapala Award for Best Journalist of the Year - English Language Press 2006, D.R. Wijewardene Award for Earning the Appreciation of His/Her Peers and the General Public 2000, 2002, Upali Wijewardene Award for Feature Writer of The Year 2001, (English) 2009, Upali Wijewardene Award for Human Interest Reporting 1998, 1999
 7 – Channaka de Silva (Daily Mirror) – Scoop of the Year 2012, Sports Journalist of the Year 2008, 2009, 2010, 2011, 2012, 2013
 6 - Robert Antony  (Virakesari) -  Upali Wijewardene Award for Feature Writer of The Year (Tamil) 2015, 2017, 2018 Business Journalist of the Year (Tamil) 2012, 2014, 2016 
 5 – K. Sanjeewa (Ravaya) - Mervyn de Silva Journalist of the Year 2014, 2015, 2016, 2017, Subramaniam Chettiar Social Development Reporter of the Year 2014
 5 – Namini Wijedasa (Lakbima News, The Island, The Sunday Times) - Mervyn de Silva Journalist of the Year 2009, D.R. Wijewardene Award for Earning the Appreciation of His/Her Peers and the General Public 2005, 2016, B. A. Siriwardene Award for the Columnist of the Year (English) 2004, Investigative Journalist of the Year 2015
 5 - Dharisha Bastians (The Nation/ Daily FT/Daily Mirror) - Mervyn de Silva Journalist of the Year 2007, 2013, Upali Wijewardene Award for Feature Writer of The Year (English) 2006, B. A. Siriwardene Award for the Columnist of the Year (English) 2013, Denzil Peiris Young Reporter of the Year 2005
 5 – Wimalanath Weeraratne (Ravaya) - B. A. Siriwardene Award for the Columnist of the Year (Sinhala) 2010, 2011, 2012, 2013, 2014    
 4 – Ranjith Ananda Jayasinghe (Lankadeepa/Irida Lankadeepa) - Mervyn de Silva Journalist of the Year 2001, D. B. Dhanapala Award for Best Journalist of the Year - Sinhala Language Press 2000, 2001, Scoop of the Year 2003
 4 – Dilrukshi Handunnetti (The Sunday Leader/Ceylon Today/The Sunday Times) - Mervyn de Silva Journalist of the Year 2012, D. B. Dhanapala Award for Best Journalist of the Year - English Language Press 2005, Denzil Peiris Young Reporter of the Year 2000, Best Environmental Report of the Year 2001
 4 – Chandani Kirinde (The Sunday Times) - Upali Wijewardene Award for Feature Writer of The Year (English) 2010, 2015, B. A. Siriwardene Award for the Columnist of the Year (English) 2009, 2011
 4 – Awantha Artigala (Daily Mirror) – Cartoonist of the Year 2010, 2012, 2013, 2014
 4 - Mandana Ismail Abeywickrema (The Sunday Leader) - B. A. Siriwardene Award for the Columnist of the Year 2012, Investigative Journalist of the Year 2009, Business Journalist of the Year (English) 2005, 2006

Main awards 

The winners of all award ceremonies held in 1999, 2000, 2001, 2002, 2003, 2004, 2005, 2006, 2007, 2008, 2009, 2010, 2011, 2012, 2013, 2014, 2015, 2016, 2017, 2018 and 2019 have been listed below.

Long Service to journalism

Mervyn de Silva Award for Journalist of the Year

D. B. Dhanapala Award for Journalist of the Year

D.R. Wijewardene Award for Earning the Appreciation of Peers and the General Public

Upali Wijewardene Award for Human Interest Reporting

Upali Wijewardene Award for Feature Writer of The Year

B. A. Siriwardene Award for Columnist of the Year

Sepala Gunasena Award for Courageous Journalism in the Defence of Press Freedom in Sri Lanka

Prof. K. Kailasapathy Award for Reporting Under Special Circumstances

Sports Journalist of the Year

Scoop of The Year

Denzil Peiris Award for Young Reporter of the Year

Best Photograph of the Year

Photographer of the Year

Cartoonist of the Year

Best Designed Newspaper of the Year

Best Environmental Report of the Year

Subramaniam Chettiar Social Development Reporter of the Year

Business Journalist of the Year

Investigative Journalist of the Year

Best Designed News Website

Health Care and Medical Reporter of the Year

Best News/Feature Using RTI

TV News Story of the Year

Other awards

Special awards made by the panel of judges

Special Award of Excellence recommended by the panel

Special Awards for the best students of the Sri Lanka College of Journalism

Merit awards and honourable mention

Merit Awards for Reporting under special circumstances

Merit Awards in D.B. Dhanapala Award for Journalist of the Year Category

Merit Awards in Mervyn de Silva Award for Journalist of the Year Category

Merit Awards in Denzil Peiris Young Journalist of the Year Category

Merit Awards in Photographer of the Year Category

Merit Awards in Best Cartoon of the Year Category

Merit awards in Scoop of The Year Category

Merit Awards in Upali Wijewardene Award for Human Interest Reporting Category

Merit Awards in Upali Wijewardene Award for Feature Writer of the Year Category

Merit Awards in Prof. K. Kailasapathy Award for Reporting Under Special Circumstances

Merit Awards in Best Foreign Report of the Year Category

Merit Awards in Sports Journalist of the Year Category

Merit Awards in Cartoonist of the Year Category

Merit Awards in Best Designed Newspaper of the Year Category

Merit Awards in Best Environmental Report of the Year Category

Merit Awards in B.A. Siriwardene Award for the Columnist of the Year Category

Merit Award in Business Journalist of the Year Category

Merit Awards in Subramaniam Chettiar Social Development Reporter of the Year Category

Merit Awards in D. R. Wijewardene Award for Earning the Appreciation of Peers and Public Category

Merit Awards for Best Radio News Story

Merit Awards in Investigative Journalist of the Year Category

Merit Awards in Sepala Gunasena Award for Defending Press Freedom in Sri Lanka Category

Merit Awards in Best News/Feature Using RTI

Merit Awards in Best Designed News Website Category

References

External links  
 Sri Lanka Press Institute
 The Editors Guild of Sri Lanka: Code of Professional Practice
 Press Complaints Commission of Sri Lanka
 Colombo Declaration on Media Freedom and Social Responsibility
 Sri Lanka Working Journalists' Association
 Free Media Movement, Sri Lanka

Sri Lankan awards
Journalism awards